Tariq Munir Cheema (born 25 March 1947) is a former cricketer who played first-class cricket for numerous teams in Pakistan from 1964 to 1976.

An opening bowler, Tariq Cheema had his best season on his debut in 1964-65 at the age of 17. He was the second-highest wicket-taker in the Ayub Trophy, with 34 at an average of 15.85 for the student team of Lahore Education Board, who finished runners-up in the competition. In the victory over Combined Services he took 6 for 62 and 7 for 58. 
 
He was a first-class and List A umpire in Pakistan from 1997-98 to 2003-04.

References

External links

1947 births
Living people
Pakistani cricketers
Cricketers from Lahore
Lahore cricketers
Karachi cricketers
Khyber Pakhtunkhwa cricketers
Pakistan Air Force cricketers
Peshawar cricketers
Punjab (Pakistan) cricketers